Aarne Veedla (born 26 November 1963 in Valga) is an Estonian historian and politician. He was a member of VIII Riigikogu.

References

Living people
1963 births
20th-century Estonian historians
Estonian Reform Party politicians
Members of the Riigikogu, 1995–1999
University of Tartu alumni
People from Valga, Estonia
21st-century Estonian historians